Puka Puka (Quechua puka red, the reduplication indicates that there is a group or a complex of something, "a complex of red color", also spelled Puca Puca) is a mountain east of the Apolobamba mountain range in the Andes of Bolivia, about . It is located in the La Paz Department, Franz Tamayo Province, Pelechuco Municipality, north of Pelechuco. It lies west of P'isaqa and southeast of Rit'i Apachita.

References 

Mountains of La Paz Department (Bolivia)